{{DISPLAYTITLE:C6H4ClNO2}}
The molecular formula C6H4ClNO2 (molar mass: 157.55 g/mol, exact mass: 156.9931 u) may refer to:

 2-Nitrochlorobenzene
 3-Nitrochlorobenzene
 4-Nitrochlorobenzene